Wang Dingguo (4 February 1912 – 9 June 2020) was a Chinese Red Army veteran and politician. She was the wife of Xie Juezai, president of the Supreme People's Court.

Biography
Wang was born Wang Yixiang into a family of farming background in Yingshan County, Sichuan, on February 4, 1912. She took part in revolutionary activities in 1926. Sold into bridal slavery at age 15, she ran away at age 20 and joined the Communist Party.  She joined the Red Army in October 1933 and joined the Communist Party of China in December 1933. She completed the Long March in October 1936.  She was a member of a theatrical troupe, she did agitprop and makeup, as well as taking up arms during battles. 

After the founding of the Communist State, Wang worked in the Ministry of Internal Affairs as a secretary. In 1959, she was transferred to the Supreme People's Court. In 1964, she was transferred again to the National Committee of the Chinese People's Political Consultative Conference, working as secretary to her husband.

Wang died of an illness in Beijing, on June 9, 2020, aged 108.

Personal life
Wang met Xie Juezai in July 1937 and married him in September 1937. The couple had five sons and two daughters. Her second son, Xie Fei, is a well-known film director.

References

External links
 Biography of Wang Dingguo 

People's Republic of China politicians from Sichuan
Chinese Communist Party politicians from Sichuan
Members of the 5th Chinese People's Political Consultative Conference
Members of the 6th Chinese People's Political Consultative Conference
Members of the 7th Chinese People's Political Consultative Conference
Chinese centenarians
Chinese women in politics
Women centenarians
1912 births
2020 deaths